Pembroke Garrison is a dispersed collection of former British Army barracks built in the vicinity of Fort Pembroke, northern Malta.

History
Pembroke Garrison developed around a Victorian fortification (Fort Pembroke), a gun emplacement, a barracks, a tented musketry camp, rifle ranges and training areas. St George's Barracks was built first, followed by Fort Pembroke, then St Andrew's Barracks and finally St Patrick's Barracks; built by the British in four main building phases 19th and 20th centuries. Part of the garrison (St Andrew's Barracks) was used as a military hospital during the First World War; during the war Malta's military hospitals and convalescent camps, particularly those at Pembroke, dealt with over 135,000 sick and wounded, most of whom were casualties of the Gallipoli and Salonika campaigns. It remained in use by the British military until 1977. St Patrick's Barracks was not constructed until World War Two.

Army units based at Pembroke Garrison between 1954 and 1967 would have been subordinate to Headquarters Malta and Libya.

At the height of its occupancy the British garrison at Pembroke included St George's, St Patrick's and St Andrew's Barracks, places of worship, firing ranges and Fort Pembroke itself; as well as a military repair base, a medical centre, a military cemetery, a garrison school and other soldier and family welfare facilities (i.e. a NAAFI shop, military post office and beach club (the 'Robb Lido' along the northern edge of St George's Bay) and regimental messes).

In May 1940 naval and army families living on the island were moved to Pembroke Garrison (into St George's and St Andrew's Barracks). Once St Patrick's barracks were constructed in 1941 Pembroke Garrison would be a critical medical support base for the island.

British Army and Royal Marines units based at Pembroke Garrison
This is not an exhaustive list of the British Army and Royal Marines (RM) units that occupied the Pembroke Garrison, but it represents those that are recorded:

St Georges Barracks - constructed between 1859 and 1862
 2nd Battalion the Loyal Regiment (North Lancashire) - 1899–1901
 4th Battalion the Rifle Brigade - 1906
 2nd Battalion the Devonshire Regiment - 1911
 The Gloucestershire Regiment - 1913
 Barracks converted to a hospital to take casualties from Dardanelles Campaign - 1915
 The South Staffordshire Regiment - 1928
 1st Battalion the Queen's Royal Regiment (West Surrey) - 1930
 The Cheshire Regiment - 1932
 1st Battalion the Suffolk Regiment - 1937 to 1939
 40 Commando Royal Marines (RM) - 1949
 73 Heavy Air Defence Regiment Regiment - 1951
 8 Commando Light Battery RA - 1976
 A flight of three RM Aérospatiale Gazelle AH-1 Helicopters - 1977

St Andrew's Barracks - not occupied until April 1905
 4th Battalion the Rifle Brigade - 1908
 39 General Hospital RAMC - arrived from UK in 1941
 2nd Battalion The King's Own Malta Regiment, acting as a POW guard force at No1 (Malta) Prisoner of War Camp at Pembroke
 45 Commando RM - 1952 Arrived from Malaya
 40 Commando RM - 1957
 1st Battalion the Royal Sussex Regiment - 1963–1965
 1st Battalion the Loyal Regiment (North Lancashire) - 1965–1967
 41 Commando RM - 1977

St Paul's Hutments
 Sick Soldiers' Hospital and Convalescent Camp
 53 Command Workshops REME - present during WW2 and up to the 1970s

St Patrick's Barracks - constructed in 1941
 45 General Hospital RAMC - arrived from UK in 1941
 45 Commando RM - May 1947 and December 1948
 37 Heavy Anti-Aircraft Regiment RA - 1956
 4th (Leicestershire) Battalion the Royal Anglian Regiment c1965-1967.

Although the Pembroke Garrison was nominally an Army facility able to house three infantry battalions, it is clear that the Royal Marines had a long post-war association with Pembroke.

Transfer of ownership to the Maltese Government
The bulk of the garrison's sites were decommissioned and handed to the Government of Malta in 1977. The barracks and their environs are now divided into a thriving community of Pembroke made up public and private housing; and a number of notable colleges and schools, many of them located in re-purposed original British Army barrack blocks.

The limestone karst countryside around promotes a unique ecology called garigue which the local authorities are keen to promote as a visitor attraction, along with the military heritage.

Legacy Pembroke site reuse noted
 St George's Barracks (part of) - Institute of Tourism Studies.
 Fort Pembroke and St Andrew's Barracks (part of) - the Verdala International School Malta.
 Pembroke Battery site - all but one emplacement redeveloped as housing.
 St Andrews Barracks (part of) - Pembroke Local Council
 St Andrew's Barracks (part of i.e. Block A, Alamein Road) - Middlesex University Malta
 St Andrew's Barracks (part of i.e. Block D, Giorgio Mitrovich Street) - STC training college.
 St Andrew's Barracks (part of) - St Michael's School.
 St Andrew's Barracks (part of) - Sprachcaffe residential language school
 St Andrew's Garrison School and the barrack's sports pitches - The National Sports School
 St Patrick's Barracks (part of) - St Clare College.

St George's Barracks (the oldest of Pembroke Garrison's unit location) has not survived intact (as did St Andrew's and St Patrick's) and this probably reflects the fact that after British withdrawal from Malta there was not the imperative and funds that there is now to preserve and use heritage imperial building stock. Australia Hall, the former REME workshops and the White Rocks Officers' Quarters areas are still in need of development and restoration.

See also 
 Fort Madalena
 Siege of Malta (World War II)
 Mediterranean Fleet
 Malta at War Museum
 Armed Forces of Malta
 Fortifications of Malta
 Paceville

References

External links 
 Pembroke Council Malta Website
 Pembroke Military Cemetery Burials Index
 Malta 1930 - 1945
 Nature Trust Malta Pembroke
 Institute of Tourism Studies

Barracks in Malta
Installations of the British Army
World War II sites in Malta
Limestone buildings in Malta
Military installations closed in 1977
National Inventory of the Cultural Property of the Maltese Islands
Pembroke, Malta